Bukit Bintang City Centre, also known as BBCC for short, is a  mixed-use development on the former site of Pudu Prison in Kuala Lumpur, Malaysia. The development is located at the south western end of Bukit Bintang, bordering Pudu along Jalan Hang Tuah (formerly Jalan Shaw) and Jalan Pudu.

BBCC is a joint development between Eco World Development Group, the Urban Development Authority (UDA) and the Employees Provident Fund Board (EPF). EcoWorld was then given the responsibility to develop the whole land as the development manager of the site.

The groundbreaking ceremony for BBCC and Mitsui Shopping Park LaLaport was witnessed by former Prime Minister Najib Tun Razak on 20 June 2017. Construction works on the RM8.7 billion project started later in Q1 2018.

History 

The site of BBCC was previously part of the infamous Pudu Prison (Penjara Pudu) which was built in the 1890s on a 10-hectare site. After the prison was uninhabited in 1996, it was opened to the public and became the first prison in Asia to open for public visits. It was also turned into a temporary prison museum for a period of 6 months. Demolition of the prison walls began in 2010, which was at one time the world's longest mural, and by 2012 the main prison complex was fully demolished.

Today, its main gates are the only portion that is still standing and maintained. It has been preserved by repainting and retaining its original shape as a historical imprint of the original site. The prison gate redefines the meaning of "coexistence" and "gathering", while the space inside and outside of the memorial resembles a link between local history, culture and community.

Masterplan 
The developer had submitted the latest master plan to the Kuala Lumpur City Hall (DBKL) to be located in the Golden Triangle area of Kuala Lumpur's busiest shopping district. BBCC Development Sdn Bhd was then formed to undertake the whole project, with the development to be 40% owned by EcoWorld and 40% owned by UDA while the remaining is owned by EPF. A total of nine towers have been planned for the development of BBCC, along with two malls.

Phase 1 – Completed in 2022 
BBCC Transit Hub (Hang Tuah LRT and Monorail stations)
BBCC Entertainment Hub (Zepp KL, GSC Cineplex, Malaysia Grand Bazaar and a banquet hall)
Gourmet Street (part of the LaLaport section)
Lifestyle Mall (Mitsui Shopping Park LaLaport BBCC)
47-storey and 35-storey Residential Suites (Lucentia Residences)
46-storey Office Tower (The Stride Strata Office)

Phase 2 – Under construction 
44-storey Japanese Serviced Apartment (Mitsui Serviced Suites)
31-storey Residential Suites 4 (SWNK Houze)
50-storey Residential Suites 3 (a residential block)
Hotel (proposed AnCasa Hotel, the building was previously under Canopy by Hilton)
 Office Tower (an office block)

Phase 3 – To be completed 
 An 80-storey building (BBCC Signature Tower)

Mitsui Shopping Park LaLaport BBCC 

The Mitsui Shopping Park LaLaport Bukit Bintang City Centre (Japanese: 三井ショッピングパークららぽーと ブキッ・ビンタンシティセンター, Mitsui shoppingupāku rarapo ̄ to buki~tsu Bintan shiti sentā), also known as LaLaport Bukit Bintang City Centre and LaLaport BBCC, is a Japanese lifestyle shopping mall located within BBCC. It is a RM1.6 billion mall under a joint venture agreement between BBCC Development Sdn Bhd and Mitsui Fudosan Co. Ltd. (Asia), a real estate company based in Tokyo by the Mitsui Group. It consists of approximately 400 stores spanning across 82,600 square metres of retail floor space.

The mall is also connected to the entertainment hub of BBCC on the east which consists of Golden Screen Cinemas, Zepp Kuala Lumpur, Malaysia Grand Bazaar and Grand Banquet Hall. Among the Japanese stores to first open in Malaysia include electronic store brand Nojima, household brand Nitori, Zoff, Mini One by DONQ, pet shop Coo&RIKU, Matcha Eight, Shin'Labo, Tamaruya Honten Steakhouse, Nitinagin&Co, Star Child and Yakiniku Sizzle by YAKINIQUEST. A cafeteria and depachika food hall based on Japanese basement-level F&B are located on the lower ground floor named Depachika Marche, while the Garden Dining food court is located on the fourth floor of the mall. LaLaport BBCC features a number of attractions such as the Central Rooftop Garden, WOW Plaza, Gourmet Street, Grand Steps and Gate Plaza.

It was scheduled to open in 2021 but was further delayed due to the Movement Control Order caused by the COVID-19 pandemic in the country. The mall was officially open to the public on 20 January 2022, making it as the first LaLaport in Southeast Asia as well as the second LaLaport to open outside of Japan after LaLaport Shanghai Jinqiao.

Incident

Collapsed slab 
On the night of 25 January 2019, there was an incident where a slab collapsed at the construction site. The developer confirmed this was a localised failure of a slab. Although there were no injuries nor deaths, the affected area was sealed off for further investigations while work of the site resumed as normal.

Transportation and accessibility 
This development is currently served by the Ampang, Sri Petaling and Monorail lines of the  BBCC – Hang Tuah station. The station is directly linked with the Mitsui Shopping Park LaLaport mall via its transit hub as well as the whole development from Entrance D of the station.

BBCC is also accessible from the  Merdeka MRT station on the Kajang Line via a linkage walkway which is a 5-minute walk northwest from the transit hub.

Basement parking of BBCC has accessibility from 5 entry points. It is easily accessible from a number of roads including Jalan Hang Tuah, Jalan Pudu and Jalan Changkat Thambi Dollah.

Gallery

See also 
 List of shopping malls in Malaysia
 Malaysian National Projects

References

External links 

 Official website of BBCC
 EcoWorld Malaysia website
LaLaport BUKIT BINTANG CITY CENTRE mall website
Malaysia Grand Bazaar
Zepp Halls Network
Golden Screen Cinemas (GSC)

Economy of Kuala Lumpur
Buildings and structures under construction in Malaysia
Residential skyscrapers in Malaysia
2022 establishments in Malaysia
Shopping malls established in 2022
Shopping malls in Kuala Lumpur
Mixed-use developments